The 1994 Big East men's basketball tournament took place at Madison Square Garden in New York City, from March 10 to March 13, 1994. Its winner received the Big East Conference's automatic bid to the 1994 NCAA tournament. It is a single-elimination tournament with four rounds.  Connecticut finished with the best regular season conference and was awarded the #1 seed.

Providence defeated Georgetown, 74–64, in the championship game to claim its first Big East tournament championship.

Seeds
All 10 Big East schools are scheduled to participated in the tournament. Teams will be seeded by the conference record with tie-breaking procedures to determine the seeds for teams with identical conference records. The top six teams will receive first-round byes. Seeding for the tournament will be determined at the close of the regular conference season.

Schedule

Bracket

Awards
Dave Gavitt Trophy (Most Valuable Player): Michael Smith, Providence

All Tournament Team
 George Butler, Georgetown
 Othella Harrington, Georgetown
 Donyell Marshall, Connecticut
 Rob Phelps, Providence
 Dickey Simpkins, Providence
 Michael Smith, Providence

References
General:  

Tournament
Big East men's basketball tournament
Basketball in New York City
College sports in New York City
Sports competitions in New York City
Sports in Manhattan
Big East men's basketball tournament
Big East men's basketball tournament
1990s in Manhattan
Madison Square Garden